Alan James Ball  (12 May 1945 – 25 April 2007) was an English professional football player and manager. He was the youngest member of England's 1966 World Cup winning team and played as a midfielder for various clubs, scoring more than 180 league goals in a career spanning 22 years. His playing career also included a then national record £220,000 transfer from Everton to Arsenal at the end of 1971. After retiring as a player, he had a 15-year career as a manager which included spells in the top flight of English football with Portsmouth, Southampton, and Manchester City.

Club career

Birth and early career at Blackpool 
Ball was born in Farnworth, Lancashire, the son of (James) Alan Ball, a former professional football player and manager and later a publican, and his wife, Violet, née Duckworth. Ball started his footballing career whilst still a schoolboy, playing for Ashton United, the team his father managed, amongst the hurly burly of the Lancashire Combination. He fell out with his headmaster over missing games for his Farnworth Grammar School team due to him signing and playing for Wolverhampton Wanderers. He left Farnworth Grammar with no qualifications.

After he left school, Wolves decided not to take Ball on. The midfielder then started training with Bolton Wanderers but they too decided not to give him a professional deal, as manager Bill Ridding said he was too small.

Blackpool signed him after Ball's father called in a favour with the coach, an old friend with whom he used to play. Ball was given a trial in September 1961 and was immediately signed up as an apprentice. He turned professional in May 1962, making his Football League debut on 18 August 1962 against Liverpool at Anfield in a 2–1 victory. At age 17 years and 98 days, he became Blackpool's youngest League debutant. On 21 November 1964, Ball scored his first hat-trick as a professional, in a 3–3 draw with Fulham at Craven Cottage.

Everton 
Ball's performances in the 1966 World Cup winning England team attracted the attention of a number of clubs bigger than Blackpool. He was eventually sold to Everton for a fee of £112,000 in August 1966, at the time a record transfer fee paid to an English club. At Everton, Ball settled into what became regarded as his generation's best Everton midfield trio, alongside Colin Harvey and Howard Kendall (they are still affectionately referred to as "The Holy Trinity"). Everton reached the 1968 FA Cup Final, but lost to West Bromwich Albion and were knocked out by Manchester City in the semi-finals the following year. Ball was as instrumental a player in the team as ever, as Everton took the 1970 Football League Championship title, seeing off a late challenge from Leeds United.

Back at club level, Everton again capitulated in the semi-finals of the FA Cup in 1971, with Ball's opening goal overhauled by two strikes from Merseyside rivals Liverpool, who went on to lose the final to "double"-chasing Arsenal. Ball played 259 times for the Toffees, in all scoring 79 goals.

Arsenal 
On 22 December 1971, Arsenal paid a record fee of £220,000 to take Ball to Highbury. He was 26 years of age and at his peak for both form and fitness when he joined Arsenal; he made his debut against Nottingham Forest on 27 December 1971.
However, Arsenal could not defend their League title in 1971–72 and also lost their grasp on the FA Cup when Leeds United beat them 1–0 in the centenary final at Wembley.

Ball had continued to play for Arsenal through all this time, as a near-constant member of the first team at first, including 50 appearances in 1972–73. However, Arsenal's Double-winning side was soon dismantled and their replacements proved inadequate; Ball remained one of the few quality players in the Arsenal side, and he was made club captain in 1974. In April 1974 Ball broke his leg, resulting in his missing the start of the 1974–75 season, in which Arsenal finished 16th. Ball also missed the start of the 1975–76 season after an injury in the pre-season friendly at Crewe Alexandra, Arsenal subsequently finished in 17th place that season. Bertie Mee resigned as Arsenal manager in the summer of 1976 and it was clear new manager Terry Neill wanted to take the club in a new direction. Now aged 31, Ball continued to play for Arsenal until December 1976, when he was sold to Southampton for a fee of £60,000. In total he made 217 appearances for the Gunners, scoring 52 goals.

Southampton 
Ball's move to Southampton was symmetrical in that he had arrived at clubs, namely Everton, Arsenal and Southampton in 1966, 1971 and 1976, when each were holders of the FA Cup. He helped Southampton earn promotion back to the First Division in 1978 and picked up a League Cup runners-up medal in 1979 after they were beaten 3–2 by Nottingham Forest.

Move to North America 
Ball then went to play in the decade-old North American Soccer League, joining the Philadelphia Fury as a player in May 1978. He was named player-coach after former Newcastle United coach Richard Dinnis was fired in June. One season later, after he was no longer coaching, he was sold to the Vancouver Whitecaps in June 1979. Almost instantly he made a huge impact with the Whitecaps and helped lead them to the NASL Soccer Bowl title that September. He also walked away with the 1979 Playoff MVP award, scoring seven goals in nine games.

Return to Blackpool 
He returned to Britain in February 1980 as player-manager of his first professional club, Blackpool, after honouring the remainder of his contract with Vancouver. Blackpool's general manager Freddie Scott substituted in the meantime. Ball's appointment was well received by the Blackpool supporters, and he returned with enthusiasm, a desire to bring back the good times to the club, and still had enough energy to take the field occasionally.

The year that followed saw Blackpool's recent ill-fortune slump even further. The club slid towards relegation, and only some determined performances (including four wins out of their final six games) ensured an 18th-placed finish and survival. During the close season, Ball brought in several new faces and was also prepared to gamble on youngsters. One of his most unpopular moves amongst the fans was the sale of Tony Kellow, a huge favourite at Bloomfield Road. The 1980–81 season began in similar fashion, with Blackpool struggling near the foot of the table. The optimism that had been in place during pre-season turned to anger as the team's performances failed to match up to Ball's promises.

After an FA Cup first-round win over Fylde Coast neighbours Fleetwood Town on 22 November, Ball publicly criticised the fans for allegedly not wanting the team to succeed as much as he did. Eventually it all became too much for manager and club, and shortly after a defeat at Brentford on 28 February 1981, Ball's contract was terminated with immediate effect and the mutual love affair had ended in ruins. Blackpool were relegated at the end of the season. In March 2005, Ball finally commented on his time as Blackpool manager. He said, "Jack Charlton, a good friend, had offered me a coaching role at Sheffield Wednesday, and with hindsight I should have done that instead: got a bit of experience under my belt. Another thing I should have done was kept Stan Ternent on. I replaced him as manager, but he was very good. I think I was a bit big-headed, a little headstrong, and I thought being a player-manager would be no problem for me. It was a lot more difficult than I thought, and not helped by dealing with the boardroom."

Back at Southampton and end of playing career 
In March 1981, Ball was tempted back to Southampton to play alongside fellow veterans and former England teammates Mick Channon and Kevin Keegan. He left Southampton in October 1982 to play for Hong Kong side Eastern Athletic, before joining Bristol Rovers in January 1983, where he remained until his retirement the following season. When Ball finally retired from playing, he had played 975 competitive games in 21 years.

International career

1966 World Cup 
Despite being in a struggling Blackpool team, Ball's industry, stamina and distribution were noticed by England manager Alf Ramsey, who gave him his international debut on 9 May 1965 in a 1–1 draw with Yugoslavia in Belgrade, three days before his twentieth birthday. Ramsey was preparing for the World Cup a year later, which England was to host, and was developing a system whereby England could deploy midfielders with a defensive and industrious bent, something which was not wholly guaranteed from conventional wide men. As a result, Ball became a useful tool for Ramsey to use – able to play conventionally wide or in the centre but still in possession of the energy to help out his defence when required.

Ball was the youngest member of the squad of 22 selected by Ramsey for the tournament, aged only 21. Though England as a team emerged collectively heroic from the tournament, Ball was one of many players regarded as an individual success, especially as he was one of the more inexperienced charges with no proven record at the very highest level. Indeed, he, Geoff Hurst and Martin Peters emerged with enormous credit and eternal acclaim from the competition – and all of them were still only in single figures for caps won by the time they were named in the team for the final against West Germany.

The 98,000 crowd at Wembley witnessed a magnificent personal performance from Ball. Full of running, he continued to work and sprint and track back while teammates and opponents alike were out on their feet. With fewer than 15 minutes to go, he won a corner on the right which he promptly took. Hurst hit a shot from the edge of the area which deflected into the air and down on to the instep of Peters, who rifled England 2–1 ahead. The Germans equalised with seconds to go, meaning that the game went into extra time. Somehow, this instilled extra bounce into Ball's play and the image of his continuous running round the Wembley pitch, socks round his ankles, is one of the most enduring of the occasion. It was his chase and low cross which set up Hurst's massively controversial second goal, and England's third; he was also sprinting upfield, unmarked and screaming for a pass, as Hurst took the ball forward to smash his historic hat-trick goal with the last kick of the game. Ball returned to a civic reception in Walkden, Lancashire following the World Cup success, where he lived with his parents and sister. Ball's appearance in the final marked the last occasion on which a Blackpool player received a full England cap.

1970 World Cup 
By now, Ball was one of the first names on Ramsey's England teamsheet and he was in the squad which travelled as defending champions to the altitude of Mexico for the 1970 World Cup. Ball famously hit the crossbar with a shot as England lost one of their group games 1–0 to Brazil. England won their other group games and progressed to another showdown with West Germany in the quarter finals, but the heat sapped Ball's natural industry. England lost a 2–0 lead and their reign as world champions ended with a 3–2 loss.

1974 World Cup 
In a qualifier for the 1974 World Cup against Poland in Chorzów on 6 June 1973, Ball became the second England player to be sent off in a full international, after grabbing Lesław Ćmikiewicz by the throat and kneeing him in the groin during a player scuffle. As a result, he missed the return game at Wembley Stadium, which became one of the most notorious in English football history, ending in a 1–1 draw. England failed to qualify for the World Cup as a result of not winning.

Captaincy and retirement 
Ramsey was sacked and Joe Mercer took over at a caretaker level, for whom Ball never appeared due to injury. However, Ball's relationship with his national side was enhanced and then soured beyond repair when Don Revie was appointed as Ramsey's permanent replacement. Ball was given the captaincy after the dropping of Emlyn Hughes and held it for six consecutive games, none of which England lost. They included a 2–0 victory over reigning World champions, West Germany in March 1975 and a 5–1 defeat of Scotland in May 1975.

After sustaining an injury in a pre-season friendly for Arsenal at Crewe Alexandra, Ball was not called up at all for England, let alone retained as captain, when Revie announced his squad for a game against Switzerland. Ball only found out when his wife took a call from a journalist asking for her reaction. Aged 30, Ball's international career had ended suddenly and acrimoniously after 72 appearances and eight goals. He was, however, the last of the 1966 World Cup winning team to leave the international stage (although not the last in the squad, as Ian Callaghan was unexpectedly called up by Ron Greenwood in 1977).

Coaching and managerial career

Portsmouth 
Ball resumed his managerial career in May 1984 with Portsmouth and was a huge success. They just missed out on promotion to the First Division in his first two seasons as manager, and he finally guided them to the top flight in 1987. However, they were relegated after just one season back among the elite, and Ball was sacked in January 1999 for failing to mount a serious promotion challenge and because of a serious personality clash with Portsmouth's then chairman Jim Gregory.

Stoke City 
The following month he joined Colchester United as assistant to Jock Wallace and in October 1989 took up a similar post under Mick Mills at Stoke City. However, Mills was sacked two weeks later and Ball was promoted to the manager's seat. He came to the conclusion that the squad he had inherited was simply not good enough and out went Chris Kamara, Dave Bamber, Leigh Palin, Carl Saunders, Gary Hackett and Nicky Morgan. Into the side came Tony Ellis, Lee Sandford, Tony Kelly, Dave Kevan, Paul Barnes and Noel Blake. It was a big gamble by Ball to change so much of the squad so quickly, and it did not pay off. Stoke stayed rooted to the bottom of the table and was relegated to the Third Division for the first time in 63 years.

Ball's next objective was to gain an instant return to the Second Division, which looked an achieveable goal as after 12 matches in 1990–91 they were one of the favourites for promotion. But Stoke's form fell off and with some embarrassing results the side dropped down the table, until after a 4–0 defeat away at Wigan Athletic Ball was sacked. Stoke went on to finish 14th, their lowest league position.

Exeter City and England 
In July 1991 he was appointed as manager of Third Division Exeter City. Although Exeter struggled (their form hardly helped by a tight budget), Ball managed to keep them in the Third Division (the new Division Two from the creation of the Premier League in 1992) in 1993, though by the time he moved on they were on their way to relegation to the bottom tier. Between February and August 1992 he also worked as a coach for the England team under Graham Taylor, including the 1992 European Championships, which were not a success for England, as they failed to progress beyond the group stages of the tournament in Sweden.

Southampton 
In January 1994, Ball left Exeter to take over the reins at Southampton, replacing the unpopular Ian Branfoot. At the time of his appointment, Southampton seemed doomed to relegation, having spent virtually the whole season to that point in the drop zone. Ball's first task as manager was to re-establish Matthew Le Tissier's role in the team and to ensure that the other players recognised that he was the club's greatest asset. Le Tissier responded by scoring 6 goals in Ball's first 4 games in charge, including a hat-trick on 14 February 1994 in a 4–2 victory over Liverpool. In the second half of the 1993–94 season, Le Tissier played 16 games under Ball's management, scoring 15 times.

After 3 defeats over the Easter period, the Saints remained in the relegation zone. In the final 6 games Saints scored 15 goals (8 from Le Tissier) and gained 10 points which were sufficient to confirm safety on the final day of the season.

At the start of the following season, 1994–95, Ball signed goalkeeper Bruce Grobbelaar but more significantly signed Le Tissier on a new 3-year deal. Despite not winning any of their first 4 games (including a 5–1 defeat at Newcastle), the Saints, assisted by 3 goals from loanee signing Ronnie Ekelund, then won 4 out of 5 games in September lifting them to 7th in the table. After this, they drifted away and only won 2 more games until mid-March, dropping into the relegation zone. On 22 March 1995, the Saints were at home to Newcastle and were trailing 1–0 with 4 minutes left, however the team scored 3 goals, including 2 in injury time, to snatch an amazing and priceless victory.

This result inspired the Saints, who won 5 of their remaining 10 games and finished the season in 10th place.

Manchester City 
Despite this success, Ball was tempted away in July 1995 to become Manchester City's manager under the ownership of former England teammate Francis Lee. His departure from The Dell was rather acrimonious and for some years afterwards, Ball's return visits to the Dell were greeted by abuse from some sections of the Saints' fans.

Ball's tenure at Maine Road was controversial, in that many observers and supporters felt he was appointed for his name and friendship with the chairman rather than for any credentials as a coach (and they argued that previous manager Brian Horton, appointed by Lee's predecessor Peter Swales, had done no wrong). This is debatable, as City had finished 16th and 17th under Horton, after finishing fifth, fifth and then ninth under Horton's predecessor Peter Reid.

Ball gave Paul Walsh, who had scored 15 league and cup goals for City in 1994–95, and cash, to Portsmouth in exchange for Gerry Creaney, who scored 4 goals for City in 1995–96. But a terrible start to the 1995–96 season saw City endure eight defeats and not win one of their opening 11 games. November saw a turnaround in fortunes when City finally managed to win a league game at the 12th attempt and follow this up with a draw and two wins which saw them end the month outside the relegation zone and Ball chosen Premier League Manager of the Month for November 1995.

City's form declined after that, and the team drew 2–2 with Liverpool on the final day of the season. The other relegation-threatened teams fared better, and City were relegated on goal difference, after seven successive seasons of top-flight football. The board kept faith with Ball, but he resigned three games into the next season's Division One campaign. He felt that he had been forced to sell their best players due to City's financial plight.

Back to Portsmouth 
In January 1998, Ball was contacted by Brian Howe, who informed him he was to make a takeover bid for the club and that he would like Ball to manage the club. This led to Ball returning to Portsmouth as manager in February 1998, however the take-over never came about. When he was appointed Pompey were several points adrift at the bottom of the table and enduring a near-fatal financial crisis, going into administration for over a year. In 1998, he masterminded a miraculous escape that saw two of his former sides (Stoke City and Manchester City) relegated after Pompey won 3–1 at Bradford City on the final day of the season. He also kept them up in the 1998–99 season, but his contract was terminated on 9 December 1999 with the club in the lower half of Division One. His departure came six months after the club was rescued from financial oblivion by new owner Milan Mandaric. On his retirement, 54-year-old Ball was the last remaining England World Cup winner in management.

Personal life 
Ball was educated at Farnworth Grammar School. Ball's father Alan Sr., also a professional footballer and manager, died in a car crash in Cyprus in January 1982. In April 2021, Ball's son, Jimmy, became the third generation of the family to manage in the Football League after being appointed interim manager at Forest Green Rovers.

Ball was always a distinctive figure thanks to his diminutive stature, red hair, and his high-pitched voice. He wrote an autobiography, "Ball of Fire" in 1967, updated as It's All About a Ball, in 1978. His third autobiography, Playing Extra Time (2004) received critical acclaim giving insight into his highs and lows in the footballing world.

In April 2004, Ball appeared for Testwood Baptist Church in the Roger Frapwell Testimonial Match at the BAT ground, Totton, near Southampton, wearing the number 7 shirt as he did in the 1966 World Cup triumph. Also in that team were former Saints manager Dave Merrington and ex-Saints defender Francis Benali. The proceeds from the game were donated to local charity SCRATCH.

As a family man, Ball struggled privately after his wife and later his youngest daughter were both diagnosed with major illnesses. Lesley, whom he married on 21 May 1967 at the parish church of St Stephen, Kearsley, Lancashire, died on 16 May 2004, aged 57, after a three-year battle against ovarian cancer. Alan and Lesley, who had been together for five years prior to their marriage, had three children together; Mandy, Keely and Jimmy. They also had three grandchildren.

He had remained in the family home in Warsash, and from mid-2005, Ball had an ongoing relationship with childhood friend Valerie Beech, ex-wife of former Bolton player Harry Beech. In May 2005, Ball put his World Cup winner's medal and commemorative tournament cap up for auction to raise money for his family, saying "They are just trinkets that take up space, I don't think I've even looked at them for years. My memories of the World Cup are more important than those things to me, and my family are even more important." The items were sold for £140,000.

Death 
Ball, aged 61, died in the early hours of 25 April 2007 at his home in Hook, Fareham, Hampshire, after suffering a heart attack while attempting to put out a blaze in his garden that had started when a bonfire – on which he had been burning garden waste – re-ignited and spread to a nearby fence. His funeral was held in Winchester Cathedral on 3 May 2007. Many of Ball's former football colleagues were in attendance, and the flat cap that he had become well known for wearing was placed on top of his coffin.

The Alan Ball Memorial Cup, a charity match between two squads of former international players, in the shape of "England vs the World", was played on 29 July 2007, with proceeds going towards the Bobby Moore Fund for Cancer Research and the Warwickshire and Northamptonshire Air Ambulance Service.

Career statistics

Club 

A.  The "Other" column constitutes appearances and goals in the Anglo-Scottish Cup, FA Charity Shield.

International

Manager

Honours

As a player 
Everton
Football League First Division: 1969–70
FA Charity Shield: 1970
FA Cup runner-up: 1967–68

Arsenal
FA Cup runner-up: 1971–72

Southampton
Football League Second Division runner-up: 1977–78
Football League Cup runner-up: 1978–79

Vancouver Whitecaps
North American Soccer League Soccer Bowl: 1979
North American Soccer League National Conference Western Division: 1979

England
FIFA World Cup: 1966

Individual
Southampton Player of the Season: 1977–78

As a manager 
Individual
Premier League Manager of the Month: November 1995

Orders and inductions 
In 2000, Ball and four other members of the World Cup winning team were appointed MBE for their services to football. Ball, along with Roger Hunt, Nobby Stiles, Ray Wilson and George Cohen, had to wait more than three decades for official recognition of their achievements.
 
In 2003 Ball was inducted into the English Football Hall of Fame.
 
In 2011, the Canadian Soccer Hall of Fame inducted the 1979 NASL champion Vancouver Whitecaps team. Ball was a vital member of this squad. He was also named a 2nd Team NASL All-Star (Best XI) for that season, and the MVP of the 1979 NASL playoffs.
 
Ball was inducted into the Hall of Fame at Bloomfield Road, when it was officially opened by former Blackpool player Jimmy Armfield in April 2006. Organised by the Blackpool Supporters Association, Blackpool fans around the world voted on their all-time heroes. Five players from each decade are inducted; Ball is in the 1960s.
 
Ball was inducted into Everton's hall of fame "Everton Giants" in 2001, and at the start of the 2003–04 season, as part of the club's official celebration of their 125th anniversary, was elected by fans as a member of the greatest ever team.

See also 
 List of men's footballers with the most official appearances

References

Further reading

External links 
 
 
 
 Alan Ball at EnglandFootballOnline.com
 English Football Hall of Fame profile
 Obituary in The Daily Telegraph
 Obituary on BBC Sport

1945 births
2007 deaths
People from Farnworth
1966 FIFA World Cup players
1970 FIFA World Cup players
Arsenal F.C. players
Blackpool F.C. managers
Blackpool F.C. players
Bristol Rovers F.C. players
Eastern Sports Club footballers
England international footballers
England under-23 international footballers
English expatriate footballers
English expatriate sportspeople in Canada
English expatriate sportspeople in the United States
English Football Hall of Fame inductees
English football managers
English footballers
Everton F.C. players
Exeter City F.C. managers
Expatriate footballers in Hong Kong
Expatriate soccer players in Canada
Expatriate soccer players in the United States
FIFA World Cup-winning players
Association football midfielders
Hong Kong First Division League players
Manchester City F.C. managers
Members of the Order of the British Empire
North American Soccer League (1968–1984) players
Philadelphia Fury (1978–1980) players
Portsmouth F.C. managers
Premier League managers
Southampton F.C. managers
Southampton F.C. players
Stoke City F.C. managers
English Football League managers
English Football League players
UEFA Euro 1968 players
Vancouver Whitecaps (1974–1984) players
North American Soccer League (1968–1984) coaches
People educated at Farnworth Grammar School
Floreat Athena FC players
English Football League representative players
Ashton United F.C. players
English expatriate sportspeople in Hong Kong
FA Cup Final players
English expatriate sportspeople in Australia